This incomplete list of works by Titian contains representative portraits and mythological and religious works from a large oeuvre that spanned 70 years. (Titian left relatively few drawings.) Painting titles and dates often vary by source.

List of works by year

References

Titian